Medicorophium is a genus of amphipod crustaceans, comprising the following species:

Medicorophium aculeatum (Chevreux, 1908)
Medicorophium affine (Bruzelius, 1859)
Medicorophium annulatum (Chevreux, 1908)
Medicorophium longisetosum Myers, De-La-Ossa-Carretero & Dauvin, 2010
Medicorophium minimum (Schiecke, 1978)
Medicorophium rotundirostre (Stephensen, 1915)
Medicorophium runcicorne (Della Valle, 1893)

References

Corophiidea